The Politburo of the 12th Congress of the Russian Communist Party (Bolsheviks) was in session from 26 April 1923 to 2 June 1924.

Composition

Members

Candidates

References

Politburo of the Central Committee of the Communist Party of the Soviet Union members
1923 establishments in the Soviet Union
1924 disestablishments in the Soviet Union